Lucifer's Palace — Polish opera in 4 acts by Karol Kurpiński. Libretto was written by Alojzy Żółkowski, based on Joseph-Marie Loaisel de Tréogate's play Le château du diable published in 1792 (another adaptation of this was Des Teufels Lustschloss by August von Kotzebue from 1801). The opera was staged for the first time on 9 November 1811 in Warsaw.

Parts of the libretto were published in Roczniki Teatru Narodowego 1811-1812. Though no part of the opera was published during Kurpiński's life, it has completely survived in full score.

Roles 
 Lancelot, a knight - bass/barytone
 Adelajda, his wife - soprano
 Gaweł, Lancelot's squire - bass
 Rządca (The Governor) or hrabia Magnus (Count Magnus) - bass/baryton
 Paź (The Page) - soprano
 Niewolnik (The Slave) or Habakuk - tenor
 Amanda or Róża - soprano
 Królowa (The Queen) - soprano
 Leida - soprano
 Emira - soprano
 Gospodyni oberzy (Tavern hostess) - soprano

Chorus: peasants, courtiers, servants.

Plot 
The opera takes place in the Middle Ages. Brave and noble knight Lancelot faces the intrigues of his newly married wife Adelajde's uncle, Count Magnus, who with a diabolical hoax tries to destroy the love of the young couple. Through many adventures Lancelot can be neither intimidated nor tempted to infidelity to wife.

External links 
 
 Full text of original French play by Loaisel de Tréogate

References 

1811 operas
Operas by Karol Kurpiński
Polish-language operas